Motilal Puniyabhi Vasava is an Indian politician from Gujarat. He is a member of the BJP.

In 1995, he was elected from Narmada district's Dediapada assembly constituency of Gujarat.

References

External links
Motilal Puniyabhai Vasava(Bharatiya Janata Party(BJP)):Constituency- DEDIAPADA (ST)(NARMADA) - Affidavit Information of Candidate

Living people
Bharatiya Janata Party politicians from Gujarat
Gujarat MLAs 1995–1998
People from Narmada district
Year of birth missing (living people)